Magic is a play by G. K. Chesterton presented by Kenelm Foss at  The Little Theatre, London, on November 7, 1913. The play went on to influence Ingmar Bergman's film The Face.

References

Works by G. K. Chesterton
1913 plays